Justice Abbott may refer to:

Bob Abbott (1932–2010), justice of the Kansas Supreme Court
Greg Abbott (born 1957), justice of the Texas Supreme Court